Lapa Sarak (also Romanized as Lapā Sarak; also known as Espā Sar and Lapā Sar) is a village in Sakht Sar Rural District, in the Central District of Ramsar County, Mazandaran Province, Iran. At the 2006 census, its population was 242, in 70 families.

References 

Populated places in Ramsar County